= Vitaly Citovsky =

American biochemist

Vitaly Citovsky is an American biochemist, currently a SUNY Distinguished Professor at Stony Brook University, State University of New York, and also a published author. He is a Fellow of the American Association for the Advancement of Science.
